The Art Directors Guild Award for Excellence in Production Design for a Feature Film is one of the annual awards given by the Art Directors Guild from 1996 to 1999.

Starting in 2000, this award is separated into different categories including Contemporary Film, Fantasy Film, and Period Film.

Winners and nominees

Movies marked with a dagger (†) won the Academy Award for Best Production Design. Movies marked with a double dagger (‡) were Academy Award nominees.

References

Art Directors Guild Awards
1990s in American cinema